The 2011 European Individual Speedway Junior Championship was the 14th edition of the Championship.

Qualification
Semi-Final 1:
May 7, 2011
 Gustrow
Semi-Final 2:
June 16, 2011
 Krosno
Semi-Final 3:
June 23, 2011
 Rivne
Scandinavian Final (Semi-Final 4):
July 7, 2011
 Seinajoki

SF 1 - Gustrow 
 7 May 2011
  Gustrow

SF 2 - Krosno
 18 June 2011
  Krosno

Final
 9 July 2011
  Ljubljana

References

See also 
 2011 Team Speedway Junior European Championship
 2011 Individual Speedway European Championship

2011
European Individual Junior